was an admiral in the Imperial Japanese Navy during World War II. He also served as Minister of the Navy. He was convicted of war crimes and sentenced to life imprisonment.

Early life and education
A native of Tokyo, Shimada graduated from the 32nd class of the Imperial Japanese Naval Academy in 1904. He was ranked 27th out of 192 cadets. One of his classmates was the famous admiral Isoroku Yamamoto.

Shimada served his midshipman duty aboard the submarine tender , and the cruiser , participating in the Battle of Tsushima during the Russo-Japanese War.

Career

After his promotion to lieutenant on 11 October 1909, he served on the battlecruiser  and battleship .

After graduating with highest honors from the Naval War College in December 1915, Shimada was promoted to lieutenant commander on 13 December and assigned as an assistant naval attaché in Rome, Italy during World War I.

Returning to Japan after the war, Shimada held various staff positions in the 1920s as a staff officer the Imperial Japanese Navy General Staff in 1920. He was promoted to commander on 1 December 1920 and assigned as executive officer of the battleship  in 1922, an instructor at the Naval War College in 1923 and commander of the 7th Submarine Division in 1926.

He was promoted to captain on 1 December 1924, and his first command was the cruiser  in 1928, followed by the battleship  later the same year.

Shimada was promoted to rear admiral on 30 November 1929, and assigned as Chief of Staff to the IJN 2nd Fleet. After Shimada was transferred to IJN 1st Fleet in December 1930, he served as Commandant of the Submarine School, before being assigned to the IJN 3rd Fleet in February 1932. As commander of the IJN 3rd Fleet, he participated in the First Shanghai Incident of 1932.

Returning to the Imperial Japanese Navy General Staff as a senior staff officer in June 1932, he served as Chief of the Third Department, Naval Intelligence, where he started espionage operations against the US, and later served concurrently as Chief of the First Department from November 1932-October 1933 when he assumed total command. Becoming Vice Chief of the Naval General Staff in December 1933, Shimada was promoted to vice admiral on 15 November 1934.

During the late-1930s Shimada's positions included commandant of the Kure Naval District, commander in chief of the IJN 2nd Fleet and China Area Fleet as well as commanding officer of the Yokosuka Naval District.

Shimada was named Minister of the Navy on 18 October 1941. During his term as Navy Minister, he knew of the plans for the attack on Pearl Harbor and approved its implementation. Although largely regarded as a submissive lackey for his reputation of meek submissiveness and unquestioning loyalty to Prime Minister Hideki Tōjō (which created considerable unpopularity and criticism among his naval associates, who would refer to him as "Tōjō's Yurufun" ("Tōjō's Droopy Drawers"), Tōjō's "tea servant" or "briefcase carrier" behind his back), Shimada played an important role in working with Tōjō in coordinating military operations between the Army and Navy during the early years of the Pacific War.

On November 30, the Emperor Showa asked Shimada if he would really wage war. Shimada said, "We are ready, I do not trust Germany, I mentioned that Japan alone can continue the war."

After a series of major Japanese losses, Emperor Hirohito lost confidence in both the Army and Naval Chiefs of Staff. As such, Tōjō was able to dismiss Chief of the Army General Staff Hajime Sugiyama and Chief of the Naval General Staff Osami Nagano. Tōjō assumed the role of Army Chief of Staff while Shimada became Naval Chief of Staff on 21 February 1944, concurrent with his position as Naval Minister. This reorganization made Shimada supreme commander of the Imperial Japanese Navy.

Shimada's power grab, however, gained him many enemies in the Navy General Staff and the Emperor's court. Shimada's opponents continuously pressured Emperor Hirohito to dismiss him, citing that the navy was losing battle after battle under Shimada's direction. Hirohito finally made his displeasure with Shimada known to Tōjō in July 1944, shortly after the fall of Saipan. Tōjō immediately asked for Shimada's resignation, and replaced him as Navy Minister with Mitsumasa Yonai on 17 July and as Chief of the General Navy Staff on 2 August.

Although appointed to the Supreme War Council, Shimada retired from active duty on 20 January 1945 remaining in an advisory capacity for the remainder of the war.

Later life and death
After the war, Shimada was arrested by the SCAP authorities and charged with war crimes. At the International Military Tribunal for the Far East, he was convicted and sentenced to life imprisonment for waging aggressive war against the United States, United Kingdom, China and the Netherlands. After the end of the American occupation of Japan, he was released on parole in 1955 by Prime Minister Ichirō Hatoyama. He died in 1976.

See also

References

Bibliography

1883 births
1976 deaths
People from Tokyo
Imperial Japanese Navy admirals
Japanese military personnel of the Russo-Japanese War
Japanese admirals of World War II
Recipients of the Order of the Golden Kite
People convicted by the International Military Tribunal for the Far East
Japanese people convicted of war crimes
Japanese people convicted of the international crime of aggression
Prisoners sentenced to life imprisonment by international courts and tribunals
Japanese prisoners sentenced to life imprisonment
Ministers of the Imperial Japanese Navy
People paroled from life sentence
Japanese politicians convicted of crimes
Japanese fascists
Imperial Japanese Naval Academy alumni